Cayennia is a monotypic snout moth genus described by George Hampson in 1930. Its only species, Cayennia rufitinctalis, described by the same author in the same year, is found in French Guiana.

References

Phycitinae
Monotypic moth genera
Moths of South America